Geraldine ‘Gerry’ Hughes is a former camogie player, captain of the All Ireland Camogie Championship winning team in 1961 and 1962.

Career
She won six All Ireland senior medals in all. Her best display may have been Dublin's 8–4 to 1–0 victory over Cork in the 1964 All Ireland semi-final.

References

External links
 Camogie.ie Official Camogie Association Website

Dublin camogie players
Year of birth missing
Possibly living people